Kobryn or Kobrin is a city in Brest Region, Belarus, and the administrative center of Kobryn District. The city is located in the southwestern corner of Belarus, where the Mukhavets river and Dnieper–Bug Canal meet.

History 
In the early times, it was inhabited by the ancient Baltic Yotvingian tribe. At various times, the city belonged to Kingdom of Galicia–Volhynia, the Grand Duchy of Lithuania, the Polish–Lithuanian Commonwealth, the Russian Empire, the Second Polish Republic, the Byelorussian SSR, and the  Republic of Belarus.

Middle Ages and early modern era 

In the 10th century, the area became part of the emerging Polish state under first ruler Mieszko I of Poland. Later, the area was part of the Kievan Rus' and the Kingdom of Galicia–Volhynia. Kobryn was first mentioned in 1287. In the early 14th century the town formed part of the Grand Duchy of Lithuania, after the Union of Krewo (1385) in the Polish–Lithuanian Union. It became the capital of a feudal principality within the Polish–Lithuanian realm, existing from 1387 to 1518. In 1500, princess Anna Kobryńska founded the Catholic church of the Assumption of the Virgin Mary. After 1518, Kobryn was ruled by Queen Bona Sforza, who contributed to its development and visited it several times.

A seat of a powiat authorities, in between 1589 and 1766 it was a royal city of the Polish–Lithuanian Commonwealth, located on Magdeburg Law. This allowed for a large number of Jews to settle in the area following the 16th century. The Jewish population in 1900 was 6,738. In Kobryń was held the county Sejmik of the Mozyrz County during the Russian occupation of Mozyrz in 1659. In the years 1774–1784 a canal was built connecting the Mukhavets River with the Pina River, named the Royal Canal after Polish King Stanisław August Poniatowski, who opened it, and as a result a water route was created connecting the Baltic Sea and the Black Sea.

Late modern era 

After the Partitions of Poland of 1795, the town was annexed by Imperial Russia. Catherine II gave Kobryn to Field Marshal Alexander Suvorov for his war merits, especially for the suppression of the Polish Kościuszko Uprising. After the unsuccessful January Uprising anti-Polish repressions intensified: estates were confiscated, insurgents and landowners were deported to Siberia (see: sybirak) and a ban on land acquisition by ethnic Poles was introduced. Kobryn was occupied by Germany during World War I.

Kobryń came under Polish control in February 1919, four months after the reestablishment of independent Poland. During the Polish–Soviet War it was the site of the victorious Battle of Kobryń in September 1920. Polish rule was confirmed under the terms of the Treaty of Riga in 1921 and Kobryń became a seat of a powiat within the Polesie Voivodeship. After the war, crafts, small industry and trade developed again, and small factories were established. In 1923, the State Gymnasium was founded, which three years later received the name of Maria Rodziewiczówna, a Polish writer living nearby, who co-financed the construction of the school.

World War II and recent times 

During the 1939  Invasion of Poland, Kobryn was the battle scene of the Battle of Kobryń between the Polish 60th Infantry Division of Colonel Adam Epler and the German 19th Panzer Corps of General Heinz Guderian. After three days of fighting, the Poles withdrew southwards and the Germans entered the town, which they three days later handed over to the Soviets in accordance with the Molotov–Ribbentrop Pact. On 14 November 1939, Kobryn was incorporated into the Byelorussian SSR.

From 23 June 1941 until 20 July 1944, Kobryn was occupied by Nazi Germany and administered as a part of the Generalbezirk Wolhynien-Podolien of Reichskommissariat Ukraine. During the latter period, the majority of Jewish inhabitants were first amassed in a ghetto and then murdered by the Nazis in their extermination camps.

Two Polish priests, The Reverend Władysław Grobelny and Jan Wolski from Kobryń near Brześć, arrested for helping the Jews, were executed on October 15, 1942 together with a number of Jews from the Brześć ghetto.

In 1944, the town was liberated by the Red Army. Since 1991, it is a part of the independent Republic of Belarus.

Notable residents 

 Enrique Oltuski  (1930 – 2012), Cuban revolutionary and politician.
 Gedaliah Alon (1901–1950), Israeli Historian
 Samuel Epstein (1919–2001), Polish-Canadian-American Geo-chemist
 Dsmitry Parchatscheu (* 1985), Belarusian Football player
 Oscar Zariski (1899–1986), Mathematician.

Sights 
Among the historical monuments of the city are the Catholic Church of the Dormition, Baroque Monastery of the Transfiguration, a park founded by Antoni Tyzenhauz in 1768, the Orthodox church of St. Alexander Nevsky, the building of the pre-war Polish Maria Rodziewiczówna State Gymnasium, the building of the pre-war town hall and the Catholic cemetery, where the family of the Polish national poet Adam Mickiewicz is buried.

See also 
 Battle of Kobryń
 Kobryn (disambiguation)

References

Further reading
T.A.Khvagina (2005) POLESYE from the Bug to the Ubort, Minsk, Vysheysha shkola,  (in Belarusian, Russian and English) 
Ye.N.Meshechko, A.A.Gorbatsky (2005) Belarusian Polesye: Tourist Transeuropean Water Mains, Minsk. (in Russian, English and Polish) Minsk, Vysheysha shkola, .

External links 

 Tourist Kobrin
 Coat of Arms
 Photos on Radzima.org
 Jewish Kobrin – Your Virtual Shtetl
 Pictures of Kobrin
 Kobryn cemetery
 A virtual tour of the city Kobrin
 Know Kobrin. Encyclopedia and guide to Kobrin
 

 
Cities in Belarus
Kobrin
1287 establishments in Europe
Populated places in Brest Region
Brest Litovsk Voivodeship
Kobrinsky Uyezd
Polesie Voivodeship
Holocaust locations in Poland